Nasip Naço is an Albanian politician and is a member of the Assembly of the Republic of Albania for the Socialist Movement for Integration, former Minister of Economy, Trade and Energy in the cabinet of Sali Berisha.  He replaces Ilir Meta, who resigned over allegations of corruption. Almost, now Nasip Naco is replaces from Edmond Haxhinasto.

Biography 
He is married to Theodhora Naço and they have two children, Betina and Franko.

Has degree in law from the University of Tirana, Faculty of Law (1992).

Was SMI Political Secretary for Berat Region in the years between 2008 and 2009.

Was elected Member of Assembly for Berat Constituency in the 18th Legislature, representing SMI and for the period between 2009 and 2011, he held the office of the Deputy Speaker of the Assembly of Albania.

He was appointed Minister of Economy, Trade and Energy from 2011 to 2012. Further, in July 2012, he is re-elected as Deputy Speaker of the Assembly of Albania.

Has held previous important offices, including Prosecutor of Berat District Prosecution Office, Director of the Intelligence Service at the Ministry of Interior, Prosecutor at the Prosecutor General Office, Chief of the Unit against Terrorist Acts and Crimes against Individuals at the Prosecutor General Office, Chief-prosecutor of Durrës District Prosecution Office.

Has attended a series of workshops and training courses on matters of criminal law and procedure, judicial enforcement and police organized by the Prosecutor General Office, the School of Magistrates, as well as trainings abroad in Italy, Poland, United States, Denmark, Germany, etc.

He is fluent in English and Italian.

References

External links 
 Official Website of the Albanian Council of Ministers

1961 births
Living people
People from Skrapar
University of Tirana alumni
Members of the Parliament of Albania
Economy ministers of Albania
Energy ministers of Albania
Justice ministers of Albania
Trade ministers of Albania
Socialist Movement for Integration politicians
20th-century Albanian lawyers
21st-century Albanian politicians